David Hilditch (born 11 December 1963) is a Unionist politician from Northern Ireland representing the Democratic Unionist Party (DUP). Hilditch has been a Member of the Northern Ireland Assembly (MLA) for East Antrim since 1998.

Hilditch was born in 1963 in Carrickfergus. He previously worked in the construction industry and for Royal Mail between 1987 and 1998. In February 1997 he was awarded the RUC Bravery Award following a post office robbery. He was first elected to Carrickfergus Borough Council in 1991. He was elected as deputy mayor in 1995 and elected to mayor in 1997 and also served as mayor from 2004 to 2008. 

He was elected to the Northern Ireland Assembly (MLA) for East Antrim in 1998 and again in both 2003 and 2007. He was one of the top questioners in the 1998–2003 Assembly, serving on the Employment and Learning Committee and Culture Arts and Leisure Committee. He is currently the vice-chair of the Social Development Committee, and he is a member of the Standards and Privileges Committee and the Employment and Learning Committee and is also currently secretary of Carrick Rangers Football club.  At the 2017 Assembly election, he was re-elected on the first count. At the 2022 Assembly election, he was elected on the fifth count.

Hilditch is a member of the Apprentice Boys. His son, Stuart, died on 10 September 2019 after a three-year battle with Multiple Myeloma.

External links
Biography at Northern Ireland Assembly website
David Hilditch at TheyWorkForYou
BBC profile

References

1963 births
Living people
People from Carrickfergus
Democratic Unionist Party MLAs
Members of Carrickfergus Borough Council
Mayors of places in Northern Ireland
Northern Ireland MLAs 1998–2003
Northern Ireland MLAs 2003–2007
Northern Ireland MLAs 2007–2011
Northern Ireland MLAs 2011–2016
Northern Ireland MLAs 2016–2017
Northern Ireland MLAs 2017–2022
Northern Ireland MLAs 2022–2027